The Philadelphia Film Festival is a film festival founded by the Philadelphia Film Society held in Philadelphia, Pennsylvania. The annual festival is held at various theater venues throughout the Greater Philadelphia Area.

Overview 
The annual festival lasts for two weeks in October. The festival also holds a three day "springfest" in June.

Venues have included the Annenberg Center for the Performing Arts, the PFS Roxy Theater Prince Theater, and Landmark Ritz Theatres, the Philadelphia Film Center, PFS Bourse Theater, and the PFS Drive-In at the Navy Yard. 

Screening categories hosted by the festival include Centerpieces, Spotlights, Special Events, Masters of Cinema, World View, Non/Fiction, After Hours, From the Vaults,  Made in USA, Cinema de France, Green Screen (Environmental films), Visions of Iran, "Sights and Soundtrack" and short films. Its Filmadelphia category, previously known as "Festival of the Independents,"  promotes local filmmakers. 

Notable members of the Festival Advisory Board include Aubrey Plaza and Adam McKay.

History
Until 2009 it was held during the first weeks of April. In 2009 the film festival shifted its dates from the spring to the fall.  There were about 35,000 tickets sold in the 20th annual Philadelphia Film Festival to over 250 screenings.

Notable films at the festival have included  Silver Linings Playbook (set in Philadelphia), Border, Burning, Green Book, The Guilty, Happy as Lazzaro, Roma, Shoplifters, Parasite, JoJo Rabbit, Portrait of a Lady on Fire, Beanpole, Knives Out, Blue Velvet (1986), Magnolia (1999), Nomadland, Ammonite, Black Bear, Minari, Sound of Metal, Philly native  Questlove's directorial debut Summer of Soul, The Sparks Brothers and Werewolves Within,

In 2017, M. Night Shyamalan and David Plaza (father of Aubrey) joined the Philadelphia Film Society's board of directors. 

Due to the impact of the COVID-19 pandemic, the PFF screened most of their films virtually in October 2020. Other films were shown via a drive-in format at the Philadelphia Navy Yard.

In October 2021, the 30th anniversary festival will screen such notable films as Belfast, The Electrical Life of Louis Wain, King Richard, The French Dispatch, Encounter and Spencer.

See also

 Philadelphia International Gay & Lesbian Film Festival
 Philadelphia Asian American Film Festival
 Philadelphia Independent Film Festival

References

External links
 Philadelphia Film Society 
 Greater Philadelphia Student Film Festival 

Film festivals in Philadelphia
Film festivals established in 1991
1991 establishments in Pennsylvania